Kentucky Route 1703 (KY 1703) is a north–south state highway extending  across central Louisville, Kentucky. The southern terminus of the route is at Kentucky Route 2052 (Shepherdsville Road). The northern terminus is at U.S. Route 31E/U.S. Route 150 at the junction of Bardstown Road, Baxter Avenue, and Highland Avenue. KY 1703 is named Newburg Road from KY 2052 to the Shady Lane intersection, where the road becomes Baxter Avenue for the duration of its route.

Route description
KY 1703 begins at an intersection with KY 2052 in Louisville, heading northwest on Newburg Road, a four-lane divided highway. The road passes through commercial areas with some nearby homes, coming to a bridge over Hikes Lane and a Norfolk Southern railroad line. After this bridge, the route becomes a five-lane road with a center left-turn lane that passes through more residential and commercial areas. KY 1703 widens to seven lanes total before becoming a six-lane divided highway as it comes to an interchange with I-264. Past this interchange, the route narrows into a two-lane undivided road and continues north into wooded residential neighborhoods. The road curves to the northwest and passes through the campus of Bellarmine University. KY 1703 continues northwest and passes between a cemetery to the west and homes to the east, becoming Baxter Avenue at the Shady Lane intersection. The route intersects US 60 Alt. and continues through more residential areas and passes to the west of Mid-City Mall before passing to the east of a cemetery. KY 1703 runs past more homes before ending at an intersection with US 31E/US 150 in a commercial area. At this point, US 31E/US 150 continue north along Baxter Avenue.

Major intersections

See also
Roads in Louisville, Kentucky

References

1703
1703
Transportation in Jefferson County, Kentucky